Fenner Ferguson (April 25, 1814 – October 11, 1859) was an American attorney and politician from the Nebraska Territory. He was most notable for his service as member of the Michigan House of Representatives in 1849, chief justice of Nebraska Territory from 1854 to 1857, and Delegate to the United States House of Representatives from Nebraska territory (1857-1859).

Biography
Fenner Ferguson was born in Nassau, New York on April 25, 1814, the son of Stephen Ferguson and Dorothy (Palmer) Ferguson. His father Stephen Ferguson owned and operated a farm, and Fenner Ferguson worked on the farm while attending the local schools. After graduating from Nassau Academy and deciding on a career as an attorney, Ferguson studied law at the Albany, New York firm of Coon and Branhall. He was Admission to the bar in 1840 and commenced practice in Albany as a partner in Coon, Branhall, and Ferguson.

In 1846, Ferguson moved to Albion, Michigan, where he continued the practice of law. a Democrat, he served as master in chancery and district attorney. In 1849, he served in the Michigan House of Representatives.

In 1854, President Franklin Pierce appointed Ferguson to serve as chief justice of the Nebraska Territory, and Ferguson relocated to Bellevue, Nebraska. While on the bench, he organized the first district and supreme courts of Nebraska, and assisted the first Territorial legislature in drafting the first code of laws enacted for the government of the Territory. He resigned as chief justice in 1857, having been elected as a Democrat to serve as Nebraska Territory's non-voting delegate in the 35th Congress. Ferguson served from March 4, 1857 to March 3, 1859. He was not a candidate for re-nomination in 1858.

Ferguson died in Bellevue, Nebraska, on October 11, 1859. He was buried at Bellevue Cemetery in Bellevue.

Family
In 1841, Ferguson married Helena E. Upjohn of Troy, New York. They were the parents of four sons,  Arthur N., Alfred G., Stephen W. and Charles F.

References

External links

1814 births
1859 deaths
19th-century American judges
19th-century American lawyers
19th-century American politicians
Delegates to the United States House of Representatives from Nebraska Territory
Democratic Party members of the Michigan House of Representatives
Michigan lawyers
Michigan state court judges
Nebraska Democrats
New York (state) lawyers
People from Bellevue, Nebraska
People from Rensselaer County, New York
People from Seward, Nebraska